Brooklyn Church and Cemetery is a historic church in Chatham, Louisiana.

The church building is a plain wood-frame structure built in 1902. It was deemed significant "as an almost perfectly preserved example of an austere turn-of-the-century country frame church. It represents a local North Louisiana unpretentious building tradition. Architecturally speaking, churches of this ilk should be regarded as remote descendants of provincial Greek Revival temple form churches. They are generally associated with the Methodist and Baptist sects and represent a building type which is a vital part of the material culture of the Upland South. But it is an archetype which is rapidly disappearing."

The cemetery has been used at least since the arrival of first settlers in the area in 1857. Almost all the tombstones date from c.1860 through the early twentieth century.

The church was added to the National Register of Historic Places on August 2, 1984.

See also
 National Register of Historic Places listings in Jackson Parish, Louisiana

References

External links
 

Churches in Louisiana
Churches on the National Register of Historic Places in Louisiana
Churches completed in 1902
Churches in Jackson Parish, Louisiana
Cemeteries on the National Register of Historic Places in Louisiana
National Register of Historic Places in Jackson Parish, Louisiana